Ludwig Hemauer (3 August 1917 – 28 August 2006) was a Swiss sports shooter. He competed in the 50 metre pistol event at the 1964 Summer Olympics.

References

1917 births
2006 deaths
Swiss male sport shooters
Olympic shooters of Switzerland
Shooters at the 1964 Summer Olympics
Place of birth missing